Paul Robinson (born 10 April 1965) is a British former figure skater who competed in men's singles. He is a two-time British national champion (1987, 1988) and competed at two Winter Olympics, placing 22nd in 1984 and 18th in 1988. In 1988, he achieved his career-best result at the European Championships, ninth, and at the World Championships, 15th. He retired from competition in 1988 and became a skating coach.

Competitive highlights

References

British male single skaters
English male single skaters
1965 births
Olympic figure skaters of Great Britain
Figure skaters at the 1984 Winter Olympics
Figure skaters at the 1988 Winter Olympics
Living people
Sportspeople from Blackpool